Ubiquitin-conjugating enzyme E2 variant 1 is a protein that in humans is encoded by the UBE2V1 gene.

Function 

Ubiquitin-conjugating E2 enzyme variant proteins constitute a distinct subfamily within the E2 protein family. They have sequence similarity to other ubiquitin-conjugating enzymes but lack the conserved cysteine residue that is critical for the catalytic activity of E2s. The protein encoded by this gene is located in the nucleus and can cause transcriptional activation of the human FOS proto-oncogene. It is thought to be involved in the control of differentiation by altering cell cycle behavior. Multiple alternatively spliced transcripts encoding different isoforms have been described for this gene. A pseudogene has been identified which is also located on chromosome 20. Co-transcription of this gene and the neighboring upstream gene generates a rare transcript (Kua-UEV), which encodes a fusion protein consisting of sequence sharing identity with each individual gene product.

Interactions 

UBE2V1 has been shown to interact with UBE2N.

References

Further reading